Martin Shubik (1926-2018) was an American mathematical economist who specialized in game theory, defense analysis, and the theory of money and financial institutions. The latter was his main research interest and he coined the term "mathematical institutional economics" in 1959 to describe it and referred to it as his "white whale" (only considering it caught after publishing his final five books on the topic). He spent the majority of his career at Yale University, where he was heavily involved with the Cowles Foundation for Research in Economics, and launched the virtual Museum of Money and Financial Institutions.

Outside of economics, he began studying inclusion body myositis (IBM) after a 2003 diagnosis. He provided seed money to the Yale School of Public Health for the IBM Disease Registry in 2011, a survey was conducted in 2012-2013, and he is a co-author on a 2015 paper about the initial results (along with his son-in-law Seth Richards-Shubik).

Personal life
Martin Shubik was born on 24 March 1926 in New York City, New York to Joseph and Sara Shubik (née Soloveychik) (both of whom were Jewish, but Russian and French, respectively). However, Joseph Shubik worked for a Scottish flax and linen company and the family returned to London when Martin Shubik was just three months old. He remained in England until World War II, when he, Sara Shubik, and younger sister Irene Shubik (1929-2019) were sent to join relatives in Canada, while Joseph Shubik and older brother Philippe Shubik (1921-2004) stayed behind. To fulfill a condition of enrollment in college in Canada during the War, Martin Shubik enlisted in the Royal Canadian Navy and held the rank of Lieutenant before retiring in 1950.

Shubik was married to Julie Kahn (d. 2018) and had one child, Claire Louise Shubik (b. 1973). Irene Shubik became a British television producer and Philippe Shubik a cancer researcher.

Education
Shubik earned a BA in Mathematics (1947) and MA in Political Economy (1949) from the University of Toronto and a AM (1951) and PhD (1953) in Economics from Princeton University, where his dissertation was supervised by Oskar Morgenstern. His other teachers included Albert Tucker, John von Neumann, and Jacob Viner; his roommates were future Nobel Prize winners Lloyd Shapley and John Nash; and his classmates included Thomas Whitin, Otto Eckstein, Gary Becker, Marvin Minsky, John McCarthy, Herbert Scarf, Ralph Gomory, Richard Karlin, Alan Hoffman, and Harlan Mills.

Shubik and Shapley used the Shapley value to formulate the Shapley-Shubik power index in 1954 to measure the power of players in a voting game. Shubik's curriculum vitae lists over 20 books and 300 articles, with Shapley being his most frequent collaborator (14 articles). Nash also appears twice, including with Shapley and Mel Hausner on "So Long Sucker - A Four Person Game" about a board game that they invented.

Teaching and other employment
Before fully committing to academia, Shubik spent time at General Electric Company (GE) as a Consultant in Management Consultation Services from 1956-1960 and International Business Machines Corporation (IBM) as a Staff Member in the T. J. Watson Research Laboratories from 1961 to 1963. During his life, he served as a consultant and expert witness for many other companies, organizations, and government agencies (including the RAND Corporation). Later in life, he was an External Professor at the Santa Fe Institute from 1995-2018.

Shubik spent the majority of his career at Yale University, where he was Professor of the Economics of Organization from 1963-1975, then the Seymour H. Knox Professor of Mathematical Institutional Economics from 1975 until his retirement in 2007 (after which he became emeritus). He was also Director of the Cowles Foundation for Research in Economics from 1973-1976 and a founding faculty member of the Yale School of Management (originally the School of Organization and Management). He taught courses in economics, game theory, and investment theory and practice.

Awards and honors
Shubik's awards included the Frederick W. Lanchester Prize (1984) for Game Theory in the Social Sciences, volume 1 and the Koopman Prize (1995) with Jerome Bracken from the Institute for Operations Research and the Management Sciences (INFORMS), and he was a Distinguished Fellow of the American Economic Association (AEA; 2010).

Other selected publications

Articles

Books

External links
Remembering Martin Shubik on Padlet

References

1926 births
2018 deaths
Princeton University alumni
University of Toronto alumni
People from New York City
Game theorists
Yale University faculty
20th-century American non-fiction writers
21st-century American non-fiction writers
20th-century American economists
21st-century American economists
Fellows of the Econometric Society
Santa Fe Institute people
Fellows of the American Academy of Arts and Sciences
Fellows of the Institute for Operations Research and the Management Sciences
Distinguished Fellows of the American Economic Association